Wolfdale is a census-designated place (CDP) in Washington County, Pennsylvania, United States. The population was 2,888 at the 2010 census.

Geography
Wolfdale is located at  (40.195791, -80.292919).

Demographics
At the 2000 census there were 2,873 people, 1,217 households, and 837 families living in the CDP. The population density was 1,202.9 people per square mile (464.1/km2). There were 1,267 housing units at an average density of 530.5/sq mi (204.7/km2).  The racial makeup of the CDP was 97.35% White, 1.18% African American, 0.10% Native American, 0.14% Asian, 0.07% from other races, and 1.15% from two or more races. Hispanic or Latino of any race were 0.52%.

Of the 1,217 households 26.0% had children under the age of 18 living with them, 54.6% were married couples living together, 11.0% had a female householder with no husband present, and 31.2% were non-families. 27.4% of households were one person and 11.3% were one person aged 65 or older. The average household size was 2.35 and the average family size was 2.86.

The age distribution was 20.2% under the age of 18, 7.2% from 18 to 24, 28.2% from 25 to 44, 27.1% from 45 to 64, and 17.4% 65 or older. The median age was 42 years. For every 100 females, there were 85.6 males. For every 100 females age 18 and over, there were 84.4 males.

The median household income was $32,257 and the median family income  was $37,772. Males had a median income of $33,222 versus $22,264 for females. The per capita income for the CDP was $15,676. About 4.4% of families and 8.7% of the population were below the poverty line, including 9.3% of those under age 18 and 3.4% of those age 65 or over.

References

Census-designated places in Washington County, Pennsylvania
Pittsburgh metropolitan area
Census-designated places in Pennsylvania